Maria Qamar (born 1991) is an artist and author of the book Trust No Aunty.

Qamar was born in Karachi, Pakistan to a father from Bangladesh and a mother from Gujarat, India. Both parents are chemists. She was exposed to both Bengali culture and Gujarati culture growing up.

In 2000, when she was nine, the family emigrated to Ontario, briefly residing in Scarborough. The family then moved to Mississauga, where she spent the rest of her childhood. She experienced prejudice and bullying against South Asian children in her school, especially in the wake of the September 11 attacks. So as she later recalled, "I started going home and drawing comics about these experiences. But I would change the outcome. In my comics I always got the last laugh."  She aligned both with her Desi identity and with Western teen goth, punk rock, and heavy metal subcultures.

She moved to Toronto and took a copywriting job in the advertising industry.  This she did not like, and she was laid off around 2015. She then gained popularity as an artist through her Instagram page where she goes by the name of Hatecopy (the name indicating her feelings for her former field). As of 2019 she had a following of over 170,000 people on her Instagram platform.

She is known for her satirical lens commenting on the hybridization of South Asian and Canadian culture. She uses a pop art aesthetic to create works that tackle themes surrounding her experiences of racism, the first generation experience, body shaming, classism, and the patriarchy. Her style is explicitly influenced by the work of Roy Lichtenstein and also by low culture such as Indian soap operas; one of her first works was captioned "what if Lichtenstein parodied Indian soap operas."  She does not translate her works for Western audiences, instead leaving South Asian terms and themes in unaltered as she focuses on a Desi audience.

Qamar has sold work at exhibitions in Toronto, Los Angeles, New York and London. The Mindy Project creator and actor Mindy Kaling collects Qamar's work and her paintings decorated the set of that show.  She had also created murals, signs, and menu and plate designs for restaurants in various North American cities.

A 2019 exhibition, entitled "Fraaaandship!", at the Richard Taittinger Gallery in New York brought her additional visibility as the youngest artist at the gallery and the first to come from an Instagram background.

Trust No Aunty won the 2018 Kobo Emerging Writer Prize for humour.

References

External links 
 Maria Qamar interview 2021

Living people
Canadian women painters
21st-century Canadian painters
Pakistani emigrants to Canada
Naturalized citizens of Canada
People from Mississauga
Artists from Ontario
21st-century Canadian women artists
1991 births